John de Pembroke (died after 1377) was a Welsh-born judge who held several senior offices in Ireland, including that of Chancellor of the Exchequer of Ireland.

He was born in Pembrokeshire. Nothing is known of his family. He was in the service of the English Crown by 1348. He was then appointed third Baron of the Court of Exchequer (Ireland). He became Chancellor of the Exchequer in 1350 and subsequently Escheator of Ireland. In 1361 he was charged with  what must have been the somewhat onerous task of supervising and enrolling all  debts, receipts, accounts, allowances and assignments in the Exchequer in Dublin.

He was still living in 1377, when he petitioned the Crown for repayment of the expenses incurred in his recent journey to County  Meath with  Alexander de Balscot, the Lord Treasurer of Ireland, to levy the King's debts and transact all of the King's other business, for which he had received no reward. On foot of his petition he was awarded £4.

A second John of Pembroke, who was also a Baron of the Irish Exchequer in the 1380s, was probably a relative of the first John.

References

Ball, F. Elrington The Judges in Ireland 1221-1921 John Murray 2 Volumes London 1926
Smyth, Constantine Joseph A Chronicle of the Law Officers of Ireland London Butterworths  1839

Notes

Chancellors of the Exchequer of Ireland
People from Pembrokeshire
Irish people of Welsh descent
Year of birth unknown
Barons of the Irish Exchequer